Nagendra Prasad Yadav is an Indian politician. He was elected to the lower House of the Indian Parliament the Lok Sabha from Sitamarhi, Bihar as a member of the Indian National Congress.

References

External links
Official biographical sketch in Parliament of India website

Indian National Congress politicians
1929 births
India MPs 1962–1967
Lok Sabha members from Bihar
Possibly living people
Indian National Congress politicians from Bihar